R.A.G.T. Semences was a French professional cycling team which existed from 2000 to 2005. It was created in 2000 as Jean Delatour, and started four times in the Tour de France(2001 to 2004), with two stage wins. The team was dissolved by the end of the 2005 season.

Major wins

2000 
Prologue Paris–Nice, Laurent Brochard
GP Ostenfester, Cyril Dessel
Stage 2b Critérium International, Laurent Brochard
Route Adélie, Laurent Brochard
Trophée des Grimpeurs, Patrice Halgand
A travers le Morbihan, Patrice Halgand
Stage 3 Route du Sud, Patrice Halgand
 Time Trial Championships, Francisque Teyssier
Stage 2 Tour de l'Ain, Samuel Plouhinec
Stage 5 Regio-Tour, Patrice Halgand
Overall Tour du Limousin, Patrice Halgand
Stage 2, Patrice Halgand
Paris–Bourges, Laurent Brochard
2nd Overall Paris–Nice, Laurent Brochard

2001 
Stage 2 Tour de Normandie, Lénaïc Olivier
Stage 2 Critérium International, Patrice Halgand
Stage 1 Circuit de la Sarthe, Laurent Brochard
Paris–Camembert, Laurent Brochard
Stage 6a Circuit des Mines, Eddy Seigneur
Stage 1 GP du Midi Libre, Jérôme Bernard
Grand Prix de Villers-Cotterêts, Laurent Brochard
Stage 2 Criterium du Dauphiné Libéré, Laurent Roux
Stage 3 Route du Sud, Laurent Roux
 Time Trial Championships, Ivailo Gabrovski
Tour du Doubs, Eddy Lembo
Overall Regio-Tour, Patrice Halgand
Stages 1 & 4, Patrice Halgand
Overall Tour de l'Ain, Ivailo Gabrovski
Stage 3, Christophe Oriol
Stage 4 Tour du Limousin, Gilles Bouvard
Circuit de l'Aulne, Patrice Halgand
Stage 1 Tour du Poitou Charentes, Ivailo Gabrovski

2002 
 1st, Stage 1, Tour du Limousin (Patrice Halgand)
 1st overall, Tour du Limousin (Patrice Halgand)
 1st, Grand Prix de Villers-Cotterêts (Laurent Lefèvre)
 1st, A travers le Morbihan (Laurent Lefèvre)
 1st, Stage 10, Tour de France (Patrice Halgand)

2003 
 1st, Stage 5, Critérium du Dauphiné (Laurent Lefèvre)
 1st, Route Adélie (Sébastien Joly)
 1st, Stage 20, Tour de France (Jean-Patrick Nazon)

2004 
 1st, Boucles de l'Aulne (Frédéric Finot)

2005 

Defunct cycling teams based in France
Cycling teams based in France
Cycling teams established in 2000
Cycling teams disestablished in 2005